KKMX (104.3 FM, "Sam FM") is a radio station broadcasting an adult hits music format. Licensed to Tri City, Oregon, United States, the station is currently owned by Brooke Communications, Inc.

History
104.3 signed on the air in 1989 as “FM 104 KTRQ” with a pop music format featuring a wide variety of contemporary hits.  In early 1991, 104.3 KTRQ briefly became a country music station, but went off the air by that summer.

In 1993, after being silent for two years, the station resurfaced as “the Hit Mix, 104.3 KKMX” with JRN's satellite-fed Hot AC format.  In 1994, KKMX rebranded as “Soft Rock 104” as they added the translator at 104.5 in Roseburg.  In early 1996, KKMX became “Mix 104” as it switched to ABC's Adult Contemporary format.  In 1998, the station returned to a Hot AC format as “104-5 Kiss FM” with a focus on the frequency of the Roseburg translator.  In 2007, KKMX stunted by playing Sammy Davis, Jr. and then flipped to Adult Hits with the “104-5 Sam FM” branding.

Translators
KKMX also broadcasts on the following translator:

References

External links

KMX
Douglas County, Oregon
1993 establishments in Oregon